The president of the University of Maryland, Baltimore County, manages the day-to-day operations of the University of Maryland, Baltimore County. The president is expected to work cooperatively with the University Senate and the University System of Maryland Board of Regents to effectively manage the university.

Chancellors of the University of Maryland, Baltimore County
Albin Owings Kuhn was the founding chancellor of UMBC, as well as the University of Maryland, Baltimore. Following the leave of Louis L. Kaplan in 1977, John W. Dorsey in the office of the president assumed the responsibilities of chancellor.

Albin Owings Kuhn – Vice President of the University of Maryland Baltimore Campuses. Chancellor of UMBC from 1965 to 1971
Calvin B. T. Lee – Chancellor, 1971–1976
Louis L. Kaplan – Served as Interim Chancellor from 1976 to 1977
John W. Dorsey – President, 1977–1986

Presidents of the University of Maryland, Baltimore County
In 1989, the office of the president was re-established following the re-organization of the public schools of Maryland under the new University System of Maryland.
Michael Hooker – President, 1986–1992
Freeman A. Hrabowski III – President, 1992–2022
Valerie Sheares Ashby – President since 2022

See also
List of University of Maryland, Baltimore County people

References

University of Maryland, Baltimore County
Maryland, Baltimore County
Baltimore-related lists